This is a list of attacks related to postsecondary schools, such as universities or colleges. These are attacks that occurred on school property, faculty or related primarily to school issues or events. A narrow definition of the word attacks is used for this list, excluding warfare, robberies, gang violence, political or police attacks, (as related to protests), accidents, single suicides, and murder-suicides resulting from rejected suitors/spouses. Incidents that involved only staff who work at the school have been classified as belonging at List of workplace killings.  It also excludes events where no injuries take place, if an attack is foiled. Each account needs a valid reliable source or it may be deleted.

College and university school incidents

1800 – 1999

2000 – 2009

2010 – 2019

2020 – 2023

See also 
 School bullying
 School shooting
 School violence
 List of school-related attacks
 List of attacks related to primary schools
 List of attacks related to secondary schools
 List of rampage killers: School massacres

References

Notes

External links 
 School-Related Deaths, School Shootings, & School Violence Incidents: 2000–2001, National School Safety and Security Services
 School-Related Deaths, School Shootings, & School Violence Incidents: 2002–2003, National School Safety and Security Services
 School-Related Deaths, School Shootings, & School Violence Incidents: 2004–2005, National School Safety and Security Services
 School-Related Deaths, School Shootings, & School Violence Incidents: 2006–2007, National School Safety and Security Services
 School-Related Deaths, School Shootings, & School Violence Incidents: 2007–2008, National School Safety and Security Services
 School-Related Deaths, School Shootings, & School Violence Incidents: 2008–2009, National School Safety and Security Services
 School-Related Deaths, School Shootings, & School Violence Incidents: 2009–2010, National School Safety and Security Services

Crime-related lists
post-secondary